Satchmo the Great is a 1957 American documentary film chronicling Louis Armstrong's 1955 international tour. Co-produced by Edward R. Murrow and Fred W. Friendly, the film features material recorded for an episode of Murrow's See It Now newsmagazine. It premiered at the Garrick Theater on October 4, 1957.

Columbia Records simultaneously released an album featuring the audio from the film.

References

1957 films
1957 live albums
American documentary films
Biographical documentary films
Columbia Records live albums
Louis Armstrong live albums
United Artists films
1950s English-language films
1950s American films